Trinity Episcopal Church, originally known as Christ Church,  is a historic house of worship in Apalachicola, Florida, United States, located at the corner of Avenue D and 6th Street (Gorrie Square). On June 30, 1972, it was added to the U.S. National Register of Historic Places.

Begun in 1837 and completed in 1838, the present church was built as a cut to order building in White Plains, New York. It was brought down and around the tip of Florida and assembled like a puzzle on its present site. Trinity was organized in 1836 in the then-territory of Florida, an inhospitable wilderness of swamps and forests where indigenous and enslaved people found haven, and outlaws roamed. It rose from that rough beginning to its status on the National Register of Historic Places and holds the distinction of being the sixth oldest church in Florida and the second oldest continuously serving church. Trinity is proud to be Apalachicola’s “Historic First Church”.

National register listing
Trinity Episcopal Church
(added 1972 - Building - #72000317)
Ave. D and 6th St. (Gorrie Sq.), Apalachicola
Historic Significance: 	Event, Architecture/Engineering
Architect, builder, or engineer: 	Unknown
Architectural Style: 	Greek Revival
Area of Significance: 	Religion, Architecture
Period of Significance: 	1825-1849
Owner: 	Private
Historic Function: 	Religion
Historic Sub-function: 	Religious Structure
Current Function: 	Religion
Current Sub-function: 	Religious Structure

See also

National Register of Historic Places listings in Florida

References

External links

Florida's Office of Cultural and Historical Programs
Franklin County listings
Franklin County markers
Trinity Episcopal Church
Trinity Episcopal Church website
Trinity Episcopal Church history

Apalachicola, Florida
Churches on the National Register of Historic Places in Florida
Episcopal church buildings in Florida
Churches completed in 1839
19th-century Episcopal church buildings
Churches in Franklin County, Florida
Historic American Buildings Survey in Florida
National Register of Historic Places in Franklin County, Florida
1839 establishments in Florida Territory